Tosca is a 1941 Italian historical drama film directed by Carl Koch and starring Imperio Argentina, Michel Simon and Rossano Brazzi. It is an adaptation of Victorien Sardou's play La Tosca and its subsequent opera version, Tosca, composed by Giacomo Puccini to a libretto by Luigi Illica and Giuseppe Giacosa. It was released in the United States as The Story of Tosca.

It was shot at the Scalera Studios in Rome with location shooting also taking place around the city. The film's sets were designed by the art director Gustav Abel.

Jean Renoir was originally hired as the film's director, and was encouraged to make the film by the French government as part of an effort to encourage Italy to remain neutral in the Second World War. However, he left Rome following Italy's entry into the war and the film was completed by the German director Carl Koch.

In 1943 it was released in Spain (where Imperio Argentina was a major star) by the film studio Cifesa.

Cast
 Imperio Argentina as Floria Tosca  
 Michel Simon as Il barone Scarpia  
 Rossano Brazzi as Mario Cavaradossi  
 Carla Candiani as La marchesa Attavanti  
Olga Vittoria Gentilli as La regina di Napoli  
 Adriano Rimoldi as Angelotti  
 Nicolás D. Perchicot as Sciarrone  
 Juan Calvo as Spoletta  
 Nicola Maldacea as Il pittore di corte  
 Claudio Ermelli as Paisiello  
 Enzo Musumeci Greco as L'ufficiale della regina

References

External links 
 

1941 films
Italian historical musical films
1940s historical musical films
1940s Italian-language films
Films based on operas
Films based on works by Giuseppe Giacosa
Films based on La Tosca
Films directed by Carl Koch
Films set in the 19th century
Films set in Rome
Films shot in Rome
Films shot at Scalera Studios
Italian black-and-white films
1940s Italian films